A Million Year Girl is the debut studio album by Australian singer Max Sharam. The album was released on 15 May 1995 and peaked at number 9 on the ARIA chart and was certified gold.

At the ARIA Music Awards of 1995 the album was nominated for four awards; winning the ARIA Award for Best Cover Art.

Reception

Anthony Horan said "This is a debut album that hides its secrets in the songs themselves, and the trip inside them is well worth it. While a bit more weirdness wouldn't have gone astray, as a career opener, this is more than just a little impressive."

Track listing

Charts

Weekly charts

Year-end charts

Certifications

Personnel
 Tony Allayialis – vocals  
 Wendy Berge – viola  
 Aud Bill – double bass  
 Tim Bruer – piano  
 Amanda Brown – mandolin, violin  
 Lucie Miller – celli viola  
 Ian Cooper – violin  
 Rebecca Daniel – violin  
 Daniel Denholm – bass, guitar, piano, guitar (bass), guitar (electric), French horn, keyboards
 Phillip Hartl – violin  
 Alex Hewetson – bass  
 Kirsty Hilton – violin  
 Nick Mainsbridge – keyboards
 Wendy Matthews – vocals   
 Sofie Michalitsianos – vocals   
 Connie Mitchell – vocals   
 Anthony "Jake" Morgan – cello  
 Ben Nightingale – guitar (electric)  
 Paul Prestige– guitar (electric)
 Mark Punch – guitar (acoustic)  
 Christian Pyle – guitar (acoustic)  
 Terepai Richmond – drums   
 Max Sharam – vocals  
 Jenny Taylor – violin  
 Ben Whatmore – guitar (electric)

Credits
 Tom Blaxland – Assistant Engineer  
 Brent Clark – Mixing  
 Virginia Commerford – Mixing
 Daniel Denholm – Programming, producer, String Arrangements  
 Nick Mainsbridge – Engineer, Drum Programming, Mixing, Assistant Producer  
 Phil Munro – Mixing Assistant  
 David Nicholas – Mixing  
 Dominic O'Brien – Design

References

1995 debut albums
ARIA Award-winning albums
Max Sharam albums